Mohammad Shafiq Al-Haik (Arabic:محمد شفيق الحايك) is a Saudi football player, a midfielder and defender, in Saudi Arabia .

References

Living people
Saudi Arabian footballers
1986 births
Khaleej FC players
Ettifaq FC players
Al-Taraji Club players
Saudi Second Division players
Saudi First Division League players
Saudi Professional League players
Saudi Fourth Division players
Association football midfielders
Saudi Arabian Shia Muslims